was a Japanese daimyō of the Edo period, who ruled the Akō Domain. He was the father of the famous Asano Naganori.

References

This article is derived from corresponding content on the Japanese Wikipedia.

1643 births
1675 deaths
Daimyo
Asano clan